= Constituency PSW-151 =

Reserved constituency of the Provincial Assembly of Sindh, Pakistan

PSW-151
- Provincial Reserved constituency for the Provincial Assembly of Sindh

Current constituency

PSW-151 is an Indian constituency reserved for a female in the Provincial Assembly of Sindh.

== See also ==
- Sindh
